On 1 August 1962, a Douglas DC-3 operated by Royal Nepal Airlines crashed in Nepal en route from Gaucher Airport to Palam Airport on an international scheduled passenger flight. The wreckage of the aircraft, registration 9N-AAP, was found near Tulachan Dhuri. All 10 passengers and four crew aboard were killed in the crash. An investigation into the crash was launched by Nepalese authorities after the accident site was located. It was the first aviation accident of an international flight by a Nepali carrier.

Aircraft 
The aircraft involved in the crash was a Douglas C-47 Skytrain version of the Douglas DC-3 operated by Royal Nepal Airlines. Its maiden flight was in 1943 with the United States Air Force Before it was sold to Royal Nepal Airlines in 1962, it was furthermore operated by Orient Airways and Pakistan International Airlines

Crew and Passengers 
All occupants on board died in the crash; they included the four crew members and 10 passengers including the Indian ambassador to Nepal. This may a juxtaposition. On a significant authority I have it as the Nepalese ambassador to India.The references don't resolve that difference.
The official report by the Civil Aviation Authority of Nepal stated that the three man crew was very experienced.

Incident 
The flight was a scheduled international flight, that took off from Gaucher Airport at 12:21 NPT for its flight to Palam Airport. There was no weather forecast available in Kathmandu, but the pilots were to get updated in flight. At 13:15 NPT, the last contact was made from Calcutta Air traffic control. After that no more contact could be established to the flight.

At the time, it was the worst aviation accident in Nepali history.
It was the second accident of this aircraft operated by Royal Nepal Airlines, who were the sole airline operator in Nepal at that time.

Investigation

The official report listed the cause of the accident as a result "from the fact that the aircraft had drifted off course while flying under instrument meteorological conditions and attempting to reach an altitude at which it would be able to resume operation under visual flight rules" before it collided with a mountain at .The Department lastly suggested to change the flight route between Kathmandu and New Delhi.

Aftermath
Investigating the accident, another Royal Nepal Airlines flight Pilatus PC-6 Porter crashed in  Barse Dhuri.

See also
 List of airplane accidents in Nepal

References 

Aviation accidents and incidents in 1962
Aviation accidents and incidents in Nepal
1962 in Nepal
Accidents and incidents involving the Douglas DC-3
1962 disasters in Nepal
Nepal Airlines accidents and incidents